Agaraea boettgeri is a moth of the family Erebidae. It was described by Walter Rothschild in 1909. It is found in Peru.

References

Moths described in 1909
Arctiinae of South America
Moths of South America